The Walter F. Burrell House is a house in southeast Portland, Oregon, listed on the National Register of Historic Places. It is currently a funeral home, having been purchased from the Burrell's in 1923 by the Holman family.

Further reading

See also
 National Register of Historic Places listings in Southeast Portland, Oregon

References

External links
 

1901 establishments in Oregon
Houses on the National Register of Historic Places in Portland, Oregon
Prairie School architecture in Oregon
Hosford-Abernethy, Portland, Oregon
Portland Historic Landmarks